Viktor Yakovlevich Litvinov (17 April 1910 – 4 June 1983) was a Soviet Russian aircraft designer and organizer of the aircraft industry.

Early life 
Viktor Litvinov was born in the city of Taganrog in 1910. In 1930 he completed his studies in the Taganrog's aviation technical school and was assigned to the Aviation Factory Number 1 in Moscow as technical engineer in the assembly shop. He graduated from the Moscow Aviation Institute (MAI) in 1937. In 1938 he was appointed the chief engineer of the Aviation Factory Number 1.

Accomplishments 
In 1938, Litvinov introduced the new system of project development, featuring prefabricated stocks with unified elements. This made a considerable economy of metal and reduced the cycles of stocks production. In 1940, he introduced the parallelism principle into the aircraft building industry: the preparations for the start of production were made simultaneously with design works and production of the new machine's plans. After the start of World War II and the evacuation of the factory to Kuybishev, Litvinov organized the mass production of Ilyushin Il-2, introducing the new principle of the conveyor line with both planes and stocks moving on the conveyor band. This innovation was further introduced into all aircraft factories of the USSR and Litvinov was made director of the factory in 1944. 
In 1965-1973 he was made the Deputy Minister of the General Engineering of the USSR.

Awards
 Twice Hero of Socialist Labour
 Five Orders of Lenin
 Two Orders of the Red Banner of Labour
 Medal "For Labour Valour"
 Two Stalin Prizes in 1946 and 1950.

References 

1910 births
1983 deaths
People from Taganrog
People from Don Host Oblast
Soviet aerospace engineers
Stalin Prize winners
Soviet inventors
Heroes of Socialist Labour